Kaloula aureata is a species of frogs in the family Microhylidae. It is endemic to Surat Thani and Nakhon Si Thammarat provinces of southern Thailand. Pauwels and Chérot (2006) in consider Kaloula aureata to be a separate species from Kaloula macrocephala.

References

Nutphand, 1989. Bull frogs or burrowing frogs. Thai Zoological Center, .
Pauwels OSG; Chérot F (2006). Translation of the original description of Kaloula aureata Nutphand, 1989 (Anura: Microhylidae), with lectotype designation. Hamadryad 30: 172–175.
http://amphibiaweb.org/cgi/amphib_query?query_src=aw_lists_genera_&where-genus=Kaloula&where-species=aureata

aureata
Amphibians of Thailand
Endemic fauna of Thailand
Amphibians described in 1989